A New Love Ishtory is an unreleased Bollywood comedy drama film directed by John Matthew Matthan. The film stars Himesh Reshammiya, Niharika Singh, Satish Shah and Rakesh Bapat.

Synopsis
Sikander Verma / Sukku is an unemployed stuntman that was once forced to sell his sperm for money. Now he's faced with the appearance of a daughter from that donation, who tracked him down after bribing a ward boy. Initially unwilling to get to know her, Sukku and his daughter begin to bond- much to the chagrin of her wealthy mother, who wants nothing to do with men. Sukku and his daughter must now find a way to convince her mother that they are indeed a family and that not all men are bad.

Cast
 Himesh Reshammiya as Sikander Verma / Sukku Bhai
 Niharika Singh as Kamya Dhanraj
 Rakesh Bapat as Prince Vikram
 Parminder Ghumman
 Ripunjay Pathak
 Satish Shah as DD
 Mukul Pathak
 Rajkummar Rao as News Reporter

Development
Bhushan Kumar first announced the film on 29 November 2007, with the intent of releasing A New Love Ishtory in 2008. In 2008 there were rumors that budget cuts would delay the film, which producer Bhushan Kumar denied. The film was later delayed, with Kumar stating that it would not release until Himesh Reshammiya's film Ishq Unplugged released.

Soundtrack

Music & Lyrics were composed and by Himesh Reshammiya.

References

External links

2010s Hindi-language films
Films scored by Himesh Reshammiya
Indian comedy-drama films
Unreleased Hindi-language films